Arabella Spencer-Churchill (30 October 1949 – 20 December 2007) was an English charity founder, festival co-founder and fundraiser and a granddaughter of former British Prime Minister Sir Winston Churchill.

In 1971, Churchill played a major role in the development of the Glastonbury Festival. In 1979, she set up the children's area of the festival and also the theatre area. Until her death, she ran the theatre and circus fields. Her duties in the 2007 festival involved the booking and management of some 1500 separate acts. She also founded and was the director of the Children's World charity.

Life
Churchill was born in London to Randolph Churchill (son of Sir Winston Churchill) and his second wife June Osborne (daughter of Colonel Rex Hamilton Osborne), and was half-sister to Winston Churchill, who was born to Randolph Churchill and his first wife Pamela Beryl Digby, better known as Pamela Harriman. She appeared, at the age of two, in the portrait of Winston Churchill and his family which hangs in the National Portrait Gallery.

She went to Fritham School for Girls, where she was Head Girl, and then Ladymede school, near Aylesbury, Buckinghamshire. She worked at Lepra, the charity for leprosy sufferers, and then briefly at London Weekend Television.

In March 1954, then four-year-old Churchill appeared on the cover of Life as part of a feature on possible future spouses of then five-year-old Prince Charles. In 1967 she was "Debutante of the Year", appeared in January UK Vogue feature "Youthquakers Face '67" photographed by Norman Parkinson, met the Kennedys and Martin Luther King Jr. in America, and was romantically linked, during 1970, with Crown Prince Carl, the future King Carl XVI Gustaf of Sweden.

In 1971 Churchill was invited to represent Britain at the Norfolk International Azalea Festival in Virginia, established in 1953 after NATO's Allied command was established there. Each year a NATO country is honoured, and invited to send a beautiful "Azalea Queen" as its ambassador. She refused to go, indicating in a letter she believed in the goals of the peace movement, and was horrified by the Vietnam War. Chased through London by a surprised press, she left instead for rural Somerset, where she helped lead the first full-scale incarnation of the Glastonbury Festival with Andrew Kerr, Thomas Crimble, Michael Eavis and many others.

During the 1970s she embraced the alternative culture of the time, which included living for a time in a squat but later worked and lived on a farm. She granted a rare interview to Rolling Stone magazine. In 1979 Churchill and Kerr were again in charge of the festival, and from then on her administration continued alongside Eavis and Kerr, along with the founding and leading of the charity Children's World and work as a fundraiser.

In 1972 she married Jim Barton, and in 1973 had a son, Nicholas Jake. In 1987 she met her second husband, a juggler, Haggis McLeod, and in 1988 they had a daughter, Jessica.

She embraced Tibetan Buddhism through the teachings of Sogyal Rinpoche, author of The Tibetan Book of Living and Dying.

Death

On Thursday, 20 December 2007, Churchill died at St Edmund's Cottages, Bove Town, Glastonbury, Somerset, aged 58. She had suffered a short illness due to pancreatic cancer, for which she had refused chemotherapy and radiotherapy.  Arrangements following her death reflected her Buddhism, and included a parade and simple farewell on the final evening of the Glastonbury Festival in June 2008.  

Festival organiser Michael Eavis, paying tribute to Churchill after her death, said: "Her energy, vitality and great sense of morality and social responsibility have given her a place in our festival history second to none."

In 2010, Eavis received a donation from British Waterways of timber from the old gates at Caen Hill Locks in Wiltshire. This was used to construct a new bridge, dedicated to Churchill's memory, at the Glastonbury Festival site.

Notes

References

External links

Arabella Churchill: The first lady of Glastonbury", The Independent
 https://hagsphotography.com/arabella-spencer-churchill

1949 births
2007 deaths
Arabella Churchill
Converts to Buddhism from Anglicanism
Counterculture festivals activists
Deaths from cancer in England
Deaths from pancreatic cancer
English Buddhists
English people of American descent
Founders of charities
Glastonbury Festival
Music promoters
People from Glastonbury
Philanthropists from London
20th-century women philanthropists
Women music promoters
20th-century British philanthropists